Intertel (previously the International Legion of Intelligence) is a high-IQ society founded in 1966, that is open to those who have scored at or above the 99th percentile (top 1%) on one of various standardized tests of intelligence. It has been identified as one of the notable high-IQ societies established since the late 1960s with admissions requirements that are stricter and more exclusive than Mensa.

History and goals 
Intertel was founded in 1966 by Ralph Haines, following the example of Roland Berrill and Lancelot Ware (founders of Mensa), who wanted to create an association adapted to the gifted needs without any specific restriction of admission (with the exception of a minimum IQ). Intertel thus became the second oldest organization of this kind, Mensa being the first.

The name "Intertel" derives from International Legion of Intelligence, and its members are still known as "Ilians".

The organizations has three purposes, stated in its constitution:

 Encouraging a meaningful and lasting intellectual fellowship.
 Fostering an exchange of ideas on any and all subjects among persons throughout the world with a proven high intelligence.
 Assisting in research on matters relating to high intelligence.

Organization and activities 
Intertel is divided into seven regions, with the majority being in North America. Region VI, also known as International, includes members from the rest of the world.

With over 1,400 members from more than 30 nations, Intertel publishes a journal called Integra ten times a year, to which all Ilians can submit content. In addition, Region Directors publish quarterly regional newsletters, and members of the society organize local activities and exchanges besides interacting regularly via email, online forums or videoconferencing. An annual gathering is held each summer.

Aligned with one of the goals stated in its constitution, Intertel's members also participate in research on high intelligence. 

In 1978, Intertel established the international "Hollingworth Award" in memory of renowned psychologist Leta Stetter Hollingworth, who specialized in research on gifted children. This award was annually presented until at least 1993, first sponsored by Intertel and then the Intertel Foundation.

See also
Mensa
Triple Nine Society

References

External links
 

High-IQ societies
Organizations established in 1966
Giftedness
Organizations based in the United States